Communauté d'agglomération de Castres Mazamet is the communauté d'agglomération, an intercommunal structure, centred on the city of Castres. It is located in the Tarn department, in the Occitania region, southern France. Created in 1999, its seat is in Castres. Its area is 406.1 km2. Its population was 78,275 in 2019, of which 42,079 in Castres proper.

Composition
The communauté d'agglomération consists of the following 14 communes:

Aiguefonde
Aussillon
Boissezon
Castres
Caucalières
Labruguière
Lagarrigue
Mazamet
Navès
Noailhac
Payrin-Augmontel
Pont-de-Larn
Saint-Amans-Soult
Valdurenque

References

Castres Mazamet
Castres Mazamet